Poyntonophrynus parkeri (common names: Parker's toad, Mangasini toad) is a species of toad in the family Bufonidae. It is found in central Tanzania and in southwestern Kenya, from the Usangu Plain in the south northward to the southern Great Rift Valley, Kenya. It is a poorly known species, however, and its distribution might be broader.

Etymology
The specific name parkeri honours Hampton Wildman Parker, an English zoologist and herpetologist from the Natural History Museum, London. Parker helped Loveridge by providing him a comparison with the type specimen of Bufo vittatus (now Sclerophrys vittata), convincing Loveridge that the specimens represented a new species.

Description
Adult males measure  and adult females  in snout–vent length. The tympanum is vertically elongate. The dorsum is muddy black (similar to the soil on which they were found). There are ochre-coloured or very dull brownish red warts. In males, the throat is dull chrome, whereas in females, it is white, as are the rest of the underparts. In preserved specimens, a V-shaped interorbital marking becomes visible.

Habitat and conservation
Poyntonophrynus parkeri inhabits sparsely wooded grassland, savanna, and flood plains. Breeding takes place in temporary pools. Threats to it are unknown, but it could be locally affected by overgrazing and human settlement. It is present in the Usangu Game Reserve.

References

parkeri
Frogs of Africa
Amphibians of Kenya
Amphibians of Tanzania
Amphibians described in 1932
Taxa named by Arthur Loveridge
Taxonomy articles created by Polbot